John Brinsley may refer to:

 John Brinsley the elder ( 1581–1624), English schoolmaster
 John Brinsley the younger (1600–1665), English minister, son of John Brinsley the elder